A city in the context of local government in New Jersey refers to one of five types and one of eleven forms of municipal government. Despite the widely held perception of a city as a large, urban area, cities in New Jersey have a confused history as a form of government and vary in size from large, densely populated areas to much smaller hamlets.

History

The 1897 and 1899 city charter laws applied only to areas with a population under 12,000, and provided for a directly elected mayor, who served a two-year term and had strong executive powers. Both featured a council elected from wards to staggered three-year terms, plus one councilman elected at-large for a term of two years. The mayor had a veto power, which could be overridden by a two-thirds vote of the council. The two acts differed in a number of ways, including the process for selection of a board of education (1897: elected; 1899: appointed by the council).

By 1987, there were only eleven cities under these City Acts (including East Orange, which effectively operated under a special City charter). As in other forms, many amendments, revisions and changes had been made over the years, leading to confusing and often conflicting legislation.

The City Act of 1987 provides for a directly elected mayor who serves a four-year term and for a council that consists of seven members; six elected from two wards for staggered three-year terms and one elected at large for a four-year term. There are three councilmen in each ward with one councilmember from each ward up for election every year. The mayor is the chief executive and votes only to break a tie. The Mayor has veto power over all or portions of any ordinance, subject to override by a two-thirds vote of the Council. The Act also provides for the delegation of executive responsibilities to a municipal administrator.

Those cities operating under pre-1987 charters could retain the characteristics of their structure of government regarding terms of office, number of positions and other powers. Provisions of the 1987 Act can then be adopted through a petition and referendum process by the 
electorate.

Municipalities

In a July 2011 report, the Rutgers University Center for Government Studies listed 15 municipalities as operating under the city form of government:
 Absecon, New Jersey
 Beverly, New Jersey
 Corbin City, New Jersey
 East Orange, New Jersey
 Egg Harbor City, New Jersey (though source on city website says that Faulkner Act form is used)
 Linden, New Jersey
 Linwood, New Jersey
 Northfield, New Jersey
 North Wildwood, New Jersey
 Pleasantville, New Jersey
 Port Republic, New Jersey
 Salem, New Jersey
 Somers Point, New Jersey
 Summit, New Jersey
 Woodbury, New Jersey

See also 
 List of municipalities in New Jersey

References

External links
 New Jersey State League of Municipalities

 
Local government in New Jersey